José Mirelis (ca. 1830 – ca. 1900) was Mayor of Ponce, Puerto Rico, from 1 May 1880 to 31 January 1881. He was a Spanish soldier with the rank of colonel.

Mayoral term
During Mirelis's mayoral administration, on 25 September 1880, a fire took place destroying most of the older civil records (births, baptisms, marriages, etc.) of the Ponce parish.  Also, on 17 June 1880, the trainway from Ponce to La Playa was inaugurated, with service to the public starting the following 23 October 1880, both under the administration of mayor Mirelis.

See also

 List of Puerto Ricans
 List of mayors of Ponce, Puerto Rico

Notes

References

Further reading
 Ramon Marin. Las Fiestas Populares de Ponce. Editorial Universidad de Puerto Rico. 1994.

External links
 Guardia Civil española (c. 1898) (Includes military ranks in 1880s Spanish Empire.)

Mayors of Ponce, Puerto Rico
1830s births
1900s deaths
Year of death uncertain
Year of birth uncertain